Marcus Vinícius da Silva de Oliveira (born 29 March 1984 in Belford Roxo) is a Brazilian professional footballer who plays as a winger for Arka Gdynia.

Career

Club
In February 2010, he joined Orkan Rumia on a two and a half year contract deal.
In the summer 2010, he was loaned to GKS Bełchatów on a one-year deal. He returned to Orkan one year later.

He joined Arka Gdynia in 2012 on a free transfer, winning promotion to Ekstraklasa as 2015–16 I liga champions. He also won the 2016–17 Polish Cup and both the 2017 and 2018 editions of the Polish Super Cup with the club.

Personal life
In March 2018, he obtained Polish citizenship.

Honours

Club
Arka Gdynia

 I liga: 2015-16
 Polish Cup: 2016–17
 Polish Super Cup: 2017, 2018

References

External links
 
 

1984 births
Living people
Brazilian footballers
Brazilian expatriate footballers
GKS Bełchatów players
Arka Gdynia players
Expatriate footballers in Poland
Brazilian expatriate sportspeople in Poland
Association football forwards
Ekstraklasa players
I liga players
III liga players
Naturalized citizens of Poland
Sportspeople from Rio de Janeiro (state)
People from Bedford Roxo